Jal Manekji Cooper FRGS (29 March 1905 – 2 August 1972) in Mumbai, was an Indian philatelist, and an expert and authenticator of the postage stamps and postal history of India. Cooper was also a Fellow of the Royal Geographical Society and the author of several philatelic handbooks. He was both a stamp dealer and a collector and was associated with philatelists like C. D. Desai, N. D. Cooper, and Robson Lowe.

Cooper is occasionally but erroneously credited with having discovered the Inverted Head 4 Annas. The 1891 reprints show that this error was already known. E. A. Smythies said the error was first discovered at a meeting of the Philatelic Society of London in 1874.

The Jal Cooper Philatelic Society, in Varanasi, India, is named after him and India Post issued a 10 rupees commemorative stamp in 1997 depicting Cooper and Indian postmarks, on the occasion of INDEPEX 97.

Selected publications
 Stamps of India, Bombay (1942), 228 pp.; 2nd edition: Bombay (1951), 226 pp; 3rd edition: Bombay (1968), 177pp.
 Bhutan, Bombay (Sept. 1969)
 Early Indian Cancellations, Bombay (1948) 92 pp.; reprint: Bombay (1991).
 India Used Abroad, Western Printers and Publishers Press of Bombay (1950) 100 pp.; 2nd edition in India's Stamp Journal  (1972); repinted in book form from India's Stamp Journal, Bombay (1972), 86 pages.
 India Used In Burma, Western Printers and Publishers Press of Bombay (1950) 67 pp.

References

Parsi people
1972 deaths
Fellows of the Royal Geographical Society
Stamp dealers
Indian philatelists
1905 births
Philately of India